Bradyrrhoa luteola is a species of snout moth in the genus Bradyrrhoa. It was described by Jean Jacques Charles de La Harpe in 1860. It is found in Spain and on Sicily.

References

Phycitini
Moths described in 1860
Moths of Europe